The College View Public Library is a historic building in Lincoln, Nebraska. It was built as a Carnegie library with a $7,500 grant from the Carnegie Corporation in 1914, and designed in the Classical Revival style, with "a symmetrical front facade, simple brick corner pilasters, a water table and wall cornice, and a pedimented entrance enframed by Roman Ionic columns in Aritis." It has been listed on the National Register of Historic Places since June 28, 1984.

References

National Register of Historic Places in Lincoln, Nebraska
Neoclassical architecture in Nebraska
Library buildings completed in 1914
1914 establishments in Nebraska
Carnegie libraries in Nebraska